Tank or The Tank is the nickname of:

Tank Abbott (born 1965), mixed martial artist
Júlio Baptista (born 1981), Brazilian football player nicknamed "The Tank"
Tank Bigsby (born 2001), American football player
Tank Black (born 1957), disgraced former sports agent
Tank Carder (born 1989), American football player
George Carr (baseball) (1894-1948), American Negro league baseball player
Tank Carradine (born 1989), American football player
Tank Collins (born 1969), American retired basketball player
Tank Daniels (born 1981), American football player
Gervonta Davis (born 1994), American professional boxer
Tony Gordon (rugby) (c. 1948/1949-2012), New Zealand rugby league and rugby union player and coach
Tank Johnson (born 1981), American football player
Frank Kaminsky (born 1993), American basketball player
DeMarcus Lawrence (born 1992), American football player
Henry Powell (Louisiana politician) (born 1945), American politician, member of the Louisiana House of Representatives from 1996 to 2008
Bajrang Punia (born 1994), Indian freestyle wrestler nicknamed "The Tank"
Tank Tyler (born 1985), American football player
Tank van Rooyen (1892-1942), South African rugby union and rugby league footballer
Tank Williams (born 1980), American football player
Paul "Tank" Younger (1928-2001), pioneering African-American football player

Lists of people by nickname